Nathaniel Haies  (also Nathaniel Hayes) (1634  died before March 12, 1706) was a founding settler of Norwalk, Connecticut. He was a signer of the treaty with the Norwalke Indians in 1655.

It took until March 30, 1686 before the planters at Norwalk obtained a Royal Charter from King James II. On this patent, John Ruscoe, Nathaniel Hayes, Matthew Marvin Sr., and Thomas Seamore were signatories.

He was born in 1634 in Dover, England. He came to Norwalk in 1651 as a member of the Runckingheage deed settlers.

He is listed on the Founders Stone bearing the names of the founding settlers of Norwalk in the East Norwalk Historical Cemetery.

References 

1634 births
1706 deaths
American Puritans
Founding settlers of Norwalk, Connecticut
People from Dover, Kent